Bosco Littorio is a sandy area with dense vegetation on the Sicilian coast in the comune of Gela, containing the archaeological remains of the archaic emporium of Gela, which dates to the period between the 8th and 5th centuries BC.

Bosco Littorio 
The area received its current name, which means lictorial wood and refers to the fasces, by the Fascist regime in the 20th century. Following the construction of the  refinery in the 1950s, the local vegetation was affected by the fumes, becoming swollen and contorted. Until the 1970s, the area was used by inhabitants of Gela as a summer resort and swimming spot. It was also frequented by people carrying out illicit excavations.

In 1983, archaeological excavations were carried out, which revealed the emporium and from 1992 the area became part of the state property governed by the Soprintendenza di Caltanissetta, which is based at Gela. The archaeological area was opened to the public on 29 May 2009.

Archaic emporium 

The Archaic Emporium, as it is identified by archaeologists, contains numerous structures (more than ten) which belong to a broad area extending from the port to the acropolis (the site of the ancient acropolis is the hill now known as Molino a vento) of the ancient Greek city of Gela, in an area bounded by the Gela river on the southeastern side. The buildings consist of regular square rooms. The walls survive to a height of more than 2 metres and in some cases preserve the ancient holes for the roof beams. In many cases, the layers of plaster which covered the interior walls are also preserved. In one of the structures, an entire door is preserved, including jambs and architrave. The walls were built of rough sundried mudbricks, probably mass-produced since almost all of them have the same measurements (60 x 60 x 15 cm).

The first phase of activity in this area is datable to the time of the Greek colony's foundation in the 8th century BC. The site developed in the 6th century, until its destruction after 480 BC, probably from natural causes. The destruction might have been caused by a tsunami: traces of a traumatic event are clear from the collapsed walls of some of the houses. Over the remains of the archaic area is evidence for a final phase of life, characterised by the celebration of feasts which probably had a religious dimension.

The discovery of the site occurred during work on the foundations of a communal kindergarten. As a result of the discovery, this work was interrupted and the building was built elsewhere instead.

In December 1999, during some excavations carried out to the west of Bosco by Lavinia Sole under the direction of Sopraintendente Rosalbe Panvini, three terracotta altars were discovered, dating to the 480s BC and decorated with reliefs of mythological figures, the gorgon Medusa with her children Pegasus and Chrysaor under her arms on one, the goddess Eos kidnaping Thanatos on another, and a triad of female figures whose significance is unclear on the third.

The shipwrecks and the emporium have been treated as a single object of research by scholars, since they were probably destroyed by the same event.

During a three-day expedition, Traffici, commerci e vie di distribuzione nel Mediterraneo tra protostoria e V secolo a.C. (27–29 May 2009), the site was opened to the workers and their families and then to the wider public; it remains freely accessible today.

References

Bibliography 

R. Panvini; F. Giudice, Ta Attika: veder greco a Gela: ceramiche attiche figurate dall'antica colonia, Roma 2003
R. Pavini, Les autels archaïque de Géla. Une découverte exceptionelle en Sicile. Musèe du Louvre, Salle de Diane (25 septembre-17 décembre 2001), Caltanissetta 2001

External links 

Zone archeologiche di Gela (acropoli e emporio greco), page on the website of the Sicilian regional department of cultural properties and public education.
"Archeologia. Vi fu un maremoto a Gela nel V secolo a.C.?" Interview with Rosalba Panvini on La Sicilia (27 July 2008), reprinted on the website CittàNuoveCorleone.
"Riemerge l'altra Gela, una «piccola Pompei»". Article from the Corriere della Sera.
"Gela- Scavi dell'Emporio. Alzato in mattoni crudi. VI secolo a.C.", images published on the site Panoramio.
"Emporio greco" , images of the site as it appears today.
Area Archeologica Demaniale "Bosco Littorio" - Emporio Arcaico (VI secolo a.C.), brief film on youtube.com.

Gela
Archaeological sites in the province of Caltanissetta
Archaeological sites in Sicily